Little Superman (Chinese: 生龍活虎小英雄, also known as Karate Superman or Bruce Lee, D-Day at Macao.) is 1975 Hong Kong martial art movie directed by Ng See-yuen and starring Leung Siu-lung.

Plot

During World War II, the Japanese military realizes that the Chinese government has stolen a secret Japanese military plan and Colonel Keno has been sent to Hong Kong to find the secret plan. Meanwhile, the Chinese officer Colonel Wong is ambushed and he must rely on his old friend Pang and his gang to put an end to a Japanese and send the plans to Hong Kong. Wong makes a deal and Pang and his gang help him to find the plan.

Cast

Leung Siu Lung as Pang (as Bruce Liang)
Tony Wong Yuen Sun as Colonel Wong
Hon Kwok Choi as Shoeshine (Pang's gang)
Mang Hoi as Monkey (Pang's gang)
Ng Ming-Choi as Mang Gong-Bing (Pang's gang)
Wang Yuen-Tai as Slingshot kid (Pang's gang)
Nam Seok-hun as Colonel Keno
Ho Gwong-Ming as Wong's Partner 
Ka Ting Lee as Otto (Colonel Keno's thug)
Cheung Kuen as Colonel Keno's thug
Peter Chan Lung as Keto (Colonel Keno's thug)
Suen Lam as traitor (Colonel Keno's assistant)
Hu Chin as hooker (as Woo Gam)

Trivia

This was a Leung Siu-Lung's first movie which he appeared as a major starring role and also it was a film that gained him recognition as a kung fu star.
The movie was originally produced in 1972. However opening to the public is 1975.
The movie has nothing to do with Bruceploitation genre although it mentions Bruce Lee on the title.
This Movie is just like in the Asia Television Limited TV series in Hong Kong As Titled The Legendary Fok.

External links

1975 films
Hong Kong martial arts films
1970s Hong Kong films